Arroio do Sal is a municipality in the state of Rio Grande do Sul, Brazil. It is about 30 km south of Torres and 30 km north of Capão da Canoa, thus in about the northern half of the state's shoreline. It is 175 km from Porto Alegre, with which it is connected via BR 101 and BR 290.

Though the population is only about 10,000, during the summer tourism season the number of people increases to about 90,000. It includes 27 km of the Atlantic coast, and has about 60 beaches.

References

Populated coastal places in Rio Grande do Sul
Municipalities in Rio Grande do Sul